Zsolt Dani (born 4 August 1969) is a Hungarian rower. He competed at the 1992 Summer Olympics and the 1996 Summer Olympics.

References

1969 births
Living people
Hungarian male rowers
Olympic rowers of Hungary
Rowers at the 1992 Summer Olympics
Rowers at the 1996 Summer Olympics
Sportspeople from Szeged